Pachydermia is a genus of sea snails, marine gastropod mollusks in the family Peltospiridae.

Species
Species within the genus Pachydermia include:

 Pachydermia laevis Warén & Bouchet, 1989
 Pachydermia sculpta Warén & Bouchet, 1993

References

 Warén, A. & Bouchet, P. (1993). New records, species, genera, and a new family of gastropods from hydrothermal vents and hydrocarbon seeps. Zoologica Scripta. 22: 1-90

External links

Neomphalidae
Gastropod genera